Richard Abraham Primus (born 1969) is an American legal scholar. He currently teaches United States constitutional law at the University of Michigan Law School, where he is Theodore J. St. Antoine Collegiate Professor of Law. In 2008, he was awarded a Guggenheim Fellowship for his work on the relationship between history and constitutional interpretation.

Education and career
Primus graduated from Harvard College with an A.B., summa cum laude, in social studies. He then earned a Doctor of Philosophy in politics at Balliol College, Oxford, where he was a Rhodes Scholar and the Jowett Senior Scholar. After studying law at Yale Law School, Primus clerked for Judge Guido Calabresi on the United States Court of Appeals for the Second Circuit and for United States Supreme Court Justice Ruth Bader Ginsburg.

Primus then practiced law at the Washington, D.C. office of Jenner & Block before joining the Michigan Law School faculty in 2001. He has taught as a visiting professor at Columbia Law School, New York University School of Law, and the University of Tokyo. Primus currently teaches Introduction to Constitutional Law and Constitutional Theory at the University of Michigan.

His maternal grandfather, Sigmund Strochlitz (1916–2006), was a Holocaust survivor and confidant of Elie Wiesel. Primus has been married to Eve Brensike, who is also a professor at the University of Michigan School of Law, since 2007.

Publications

See also 
 List of law clerks of the Supreme Court of the United States (Seat 6)

References

1969 births
Living people
American legal scholars
Harvard College alumni
Alumni of Balliol College, Oxford
American Rhodes Scholars
Yale Law School alumni
Law clerks of the Supreme Court of the United States
University of Michigan faculty
University of Michigan Law School faculty
People associated with Jenner & Block